The 72nd Reserve Infantry Division (Korean: 제72동원보병사단) is a military formation of the Republic of Korea Reserve Forces (ROKA). The division is subordinated to the Mobilization Force Command and is headquartered in Yangju City, Gyeonggi Province. During the peacetime, they are in charge of recruit training and active as a second line military unit.

The division was created on 1 April 1987.

Organization
Headquarters:
Headquarters Battalion
Reconnaissance Battalion
Engineer Battalion
Armor Battalion
Chemical Company		
Signal Battalion
Support Battalion
Medical Battalion
200th Infantry Brigade
201st Infantry Brigade
202nd Infantry Brigade
Artillery Brigade
3 Artillery Battalions (equipped with M101 howitzer)
Artillery Battalion (equipped with M114 howitzer)

See also
Korean Demilitarized Zone

References

InfDiv0072
InfDiv0072SK
Military units and formations established in 1987